Atlantis II: Milo's Return (also known as simply Atlantis: Milo's Return) is a 2003 American animated science-fiction film directed by Victor Cook, Toby Shelton, and Tad Stones. It is the sequel to Atlantis: The Lost Empire (2001). The film received a direct-to-video release on May 20, 2003.

Originally, Disney was developing a sequel titled Shards of Chaos, but it was abandoned once The Lost Empire was less successful than anticipated. The released sequel consists of three segments, which are "Kraken", "Spirit of the West" and "Spear of Destiny". They were originally meant to be episodes of a series that was never completed called Team Atlantis. Some additional animation was done to link the stories more closely.

Cree Summer (Kida), Corey Burton (Mole), Don Novello (Vinny), Phil Morris (Dr. Sweet), Jacqueline Obradors (Audrey), John Mahoney (Mr. Whitmore), and Florence Stanley (Mrs. Packard) all reprise their roles from the first film, with James Arnold Taylor replacing Michael J. Fox as Milo and Steve Barr replacing Jim Varney, who died before the first film finished production, as Cookie. This is Stanley's final film; she died months after production ended.

Plot
After the decline in Atlantean culture following the sinking, Kida, now Queen Regnant and married to Milo Thatch, now Prince Consort, are using the heart of Atlantis to restore the city's former glory. Suddenly, Milo's comrades and Mr. Whitmore arrive in Atlantis; while their arrival is unexpected, the Atlanteans welcome their old friends. Unfortunately, they have come to inform them of a mysterious creature causing trouble on the surface. Kida suspects that the creature might be Atlantean, stirring mixed feelings about her father's decision to keep the Crystal hidden.

They arrive in Trondheim, Norway and discover that the mysterious problem is actually the creature known as the Kraken, which had been attacking shipping freighters and taking their cargo to a cliffside village. At first they presume it to be an ancient Atlantean war machine gone rogue (like the Leviathan from the previous film), but they discover that the town magistrate, Edgar Volgud, seems to be controlling the Kraken. They soon learn, though, that the Kraken itself is the master, having made a deal with Volgud to preserve the life of the town and Edgar's lifespan in exchange for their souls. When they blow up the Kraken, Volgud's immortality ceases and he disintegrates, while the spirit of the village is restored.

All the while, Kida is learning about the outside world and is adapting well. However, she still feels guilty, as there could still be other Atlantean war machines in the world causing problems, like the Leviathan. Their next mystery is in the Southwestern United States, involving coyote spirits opposing them. They later find a hidden city in Arizona that contains Atlantean architecture, which Kida realizes is an abandoned Atlantean colony. Unfortunately, a very sly shop owner, Ashton Carnaby, intends to pillage the place for its valuables, but the spirits then turn him into one of them. A mysterious man named Chakashi, who is a Native American wind spirit, trusts them with the knowledge of their sanctuary and informs Kida that she can choose Atlantis' destiny.

Returning home, the adventurers discover that one of Whitmore's old competitors, Erik Hellstrom, who, after the stock market crash sank his company, went insane believing he was Odin, the Norse king of the gods, broke in at night and stole one of Whitmore's possessions, an ancient spear called the Gungnir, an artifact of Atlantean origin. When they track him down in the frigid Nordic Mountains, he presumes Milo to be the God of Mischief, Loki, and Kida to be his long lost daughter, Brünnhilde. Then, "Odin" uses the spear to cast Milo, Mole, Vinny and Audrey out of "Asgard" before kidnapping Kida and dressing her in Norse clothing. He explains that his intentions are to end the world in Ragnarok, the prophesied apocalypse told in Norse mythology. He creates a lava beast and an ice beast to destroy the world, but well-placed explosives used by Vinny distract the monsters long enough for Kida to retrieve the spear and vanquish the beasts. During these escapades, Kida comes into a greater understanding of just how powerful the Atlantean Crystal is, and that she must choose between hiding it and sharing it with the rest of mankind.

Having retrieved the spear, Kida realizes her father was wrong to hide the Crystal from mankind. She combines the Spear with the Heart Crystal and lifts Atlantis above water. Fishermen are shocked at seeing the entire city rise before them. With Atlantis above the water for the first time in over 8,000 years, Mr. Whitmore narrates that from then on, the world was a better place.

Cast
 James Taylor as Milo
 Cree Summer as Kida
 John Mahoney as Whitmore
 Jacqueline Obradors as Audrey / Nurse
 Don Novello as Vinny
 Corey Burton as Mole
 Phil Morris as Sweet
 Florence Stanley as Packard
 Frank Welker as Obby / Mantell 
 Steven Barr as Cookie
 Clancy Brown as Volgud
 Jean Gilpin as Inger
 Kai Larson as Seaman / Gunnar
 Bill Fagerbakke as Sven
 Tom Wilson as Carnaby
 Floyd Westerman as Chakashi
 Jeff Bennett as Sam McKeane
 Morgan Sheppard as Erik Hellstrom

Team Atlantis television series

Unmade episodes
The series would have featured episodes with different legends incorporated, such as Puck, the Loch Ness Monster and the Terracotta Warriors.

James Arnold Taylor, who voices Milo, said in a vlog posted to his personal YouTube channel that the show would have been either 18 or 24 episodes long.

The Last
One of the episodes of Team Atlantis that was never animated featured an appearance by Demona from Gargoyles. It introduced the hunter known as Fiona Canmore, known friend to Dr. Sweet. The episode would have Demona using the Praying Gargoyle statue to bring Gargoyle statues in Paris alive to kill the local humans.

Scripts and voice recording of the episode can be seen at The Gathering conventions. Marina Sirtis reprises her role as Demona, and Fiona Canmore is voiced by Sheena Easton. Greg Weisman, who wrote the episode, planned to use the story for the Gargoyles comic book series.  He said if he is unable to use the Atlantis characters, then he will use analogs for the story.

Greg has mentioned that while the episode itself is canon in the Gargoyles universe, the entire series Team Atlantis is not. In fact, the Team Atlantis interpretations of the Loch Ness Monster and Puck differ from those seen in Gargoyles (notably, the Loch Ness Monster in Gargoyles actually is a surviving plesiosaur belonging to a colony, like the common depiction).

References

External links
 
 
 

2003 science fiction action films
2000s action adventure films
2000s American animated films
2000s children's animated films
2000s fantasy adventure films
2000s English-language films
2003 films
2003 animated films
2003 computer-animated films
2003 direct-to-video films
American films with live action and animation
American sequel films
Animated films based on Norse mythology
Milo's Return
Direct-to-video sequel films
Disney direct-to-video animated films
Disney Television Animation films
DisneyToon Studios animated films
Fictional-language films
Films directed by Victor Cook
Films directed by Tad Stones
Films set in Arizona
Films set in Europe
Films about impact events
Kraken in popular culture
Television films as pilots
Television pilots not picked up as a series
Science fantasy films
Films with screenplays by Henry Gilroy
Alternate history films
Films set in the 1910s